The Circle & the Square is the debut album by British pop group Red Box, released in 1986. The album contains the group's two UK top ten hit singles, "Lean on Me", which reached number three, and "For America", which reached number 10. Three other singles are included on the album: the band's debut "Chenko (Tenka-Io)", which originally failed to chart in 1984 but reached number 77 when re-issued in 1987, "Saskatchewan", which also failed to chart in 1984, and "Heart of the Sun" which reached number 71 in 1987.

Track listing
All tracks written by Simon Toulson-Clarke, except where noted.

WEA LP: WX79 (Gatefold sleeve: WX79T)

WEA CD: WX79CD

2008 Cherry Pop CD: CR POP 9

Personnel

Musicians
Simon Toulson-Clarke – lead vocals, acoustic guitar
Julian Close – programming, saxophone, flute
Chris Wyles – drums, percussion
Simon Edwards – bass guitar
Ginny Clee – additional vocals
Martin Noakes – piano
Neil Taylor – electric guitar
Alison Lea – marimba, vibraphone, tuned percussion
David Motion, Alan Park, Gavin Povey, Gary Hutchins – keyboards
Viktor Sebek – accordion
Bruce Nockles – trumpet
Philip Eastop – French horn
Helen Tunstall – harp
Alexander Balanescu, Bobby Valentino – violin
Matthew Cang – echo and tremolo guitar
Ginny Clee, Lucy Clee, Simon Edwards, Kris Gould, Tony Head, Mark Hoye, Ian Hunt, Gary Hutchins, Leroy James, Suzanna Lindsey, Ian MacKinnon, Martin Noakes, Anna Pavlou, Paddy Talbot, Sue Thomas, Jennie Tsao, Ian Whitmore – Box vox

Production
"Leaders in Seventh Heaven" brass arrangement by Andrew Poppy
"Billy's Line" keyboard arrangement by Paddy Talbot
Produced by David Motion
Engineered by Trigger
"Lean on Me" produced by David Motion and Chris Hughes
Additional engineering by David Bascombe, Chris Baylis, Phil Harding, Steve Jackson
Assistants: Anna Pavlou, Mark Boyne, Paul Townrow, Irene Hogan, Matt Howe, Mike Bigwood, JB Lierre, Seb Gore, Mike Dignam
Recorded at Eden, Air, Jam, Tapestry, Strongroom, Woolhall, Eel Pie, and VM Studios
Mixed at Eden, Mayfair, Townhouse, Farmyard, PWI, Tapestry
Mastered at Arum at the Master Room
Sleeve design: David Black
Photographs: Paul Rider
Cover illustration: Kathy Felstead
Inside illustrations: Helen Jones
House with Hat on illustration: Joanna Roscoe, Soho parish school, London

Charts

References

1986 debut albums
Red Box (band) albums
Warner Records albums
Worldbeat albums
Albums produced by Chris Hughes (musician)